Meterythrosia is a monotypic moth genus in the subfamily Arctiinae erected by George Hampson in 1900. Its single species, Meterythrosia sangala, was first described by Herbert Druce in 1885. It is found in Guatemala.

References

Lithosiini
Monotypic moth genera
Moths of Central America